Daniel Thomas McCarty (January 18, 1912 –  September 28, 1953) was an American politician who served in the Florida House of Representatives and served as its speaker. He briefly served as the 31st Governor of Florida from January 6, 1953 until his death of September 28, 1953.

Early life
Dan McCarty was born on January 18, 1912, in Fort Pierce, Florida and was the son of Daniel Thomas McCarty and Frances Lardner Moore. His grandfather, Charles "C.T." Tobin McCarty would begin an operation growing pineapples during the 1880s in St. Lucie County. C.T. would be killed during a real estate dispute when he was leaving a barber shop in Fort Pierce on January 30, 1907.

His family was described as being prominent and he grew up in a large house on Indian River Drive just south of the present courthouse in downtown Fort Pierce. He attended the local public school in the area, Delaware Avenue School. While attending high school he would be the captain of the school's football team, editor-in-chief of the school yearbook and serve as vice president of his class. After high school he would go to the University of Florida. While at the University of Florida he was extremely active within  Florida Blue Key, Student Government, the Sigma Phi Epsilon fraternity, and ROTC.

After finishing his education in 1934, McCarty became a cattleman and citrus grower in Fort Pierce. He married Olie Brown with whom he had three children.

During World War II, he served in the U.S. Army, was promoted to the rank of colonel, and was decorated with the Bronze Star Medal, the Purple Heart, the Legion of Merit, and the French Croix de Guerre.  During World War II, he distinguished himself by being among those who landed on D-Day with the Seventh Army in the South of France.

Political career
He began his political career when in 1937, he was elected to the Florida House of Representatives where he served until 1941. During the 1941 session, he served as speaker of the house. In 1948 he was the runner up for the Democratic nomination for governor. Four years later in 1952, he ran for governor again, and this time was successful in winning the office. During his tenure, he reformed purchasing and hiring practices by the state government, boosted teachers' salaries and created scholarships for teacher training, opposed oil exploration in the Everglades, and instituted aid programs for the disabled. A chain smoker, McCarty's health was already weakened by the end of the 1952 Gubernatorial contest.

On February 25, 1953, shortly after assuming the governorship, he suffered a debilitating heart attack.  For months McCarty struggled to regain his strength, spending most of his days working in the Governor's mansion. Finally in early September he contracted a severe case of pneumonia and died on September 28, 1953, in Tallahassee.  After a large funeral at his lifelong parish church, the old Carpenter Gothic St. Andrew's Episcopal Church across the street from his boyhood home in Fort Pierce, he was buried in the Palms Cemetery three miles south on Indian River Drive in Ankona. The beginning of the bumper-to-bumper funeral procession reached the small cemetery before the last cars had left the church area.

Honors 
Dan McCarty Middle School, in St. Lucie County, was named in his honor.

A sabal palm tree was planted on the grounds of the Florida State Capitol in honor of him as he would sign a bill as governor making the sabal palm the official state tree.

References

External links

 Official Governor's portrait and biography from the State of Florida
 National Governors Association
 
 St. Lucie County Historical Society

1912 births
1953 deaths
People from Fort Pierce, Florida
Citrus farmers from Florida
United States Army personnel of World War II
Democratic Party governors of Florida
Recipients of the Croix de Guerre 1939–1945 (France)
Recipients of the Legion of Merit
Speakers of the Florida House of Representatives
Democratic Party members of the Florida House of Representatives
United States Army colonels
University of Florida alumni
20th-century American politicians
20th-century American Episcopalians